Cipriani may refer to:

People
Surname
 Alessandro Cipriani (born 1959), Italian composer
 Amilcare Cipriani (1843–1918), Italian anarchist
 Andre Cipriani (died 1953), Trinidadian cricketer
 Antoine Cipriani (born 1954), French sprint canoer
 Arthur Andrew Cipriani (1875–1945), a Trinidadian labour leader and politician
 Belo Cipriani (born 1980), Guatemalan-American writer, activist and entrepreneur
 Carmela Cipriani (born 1996), Italian racing cyclist
 Danny Cipriani (born 1987), English rugby player
 Der Reka Cipriani (born 1943), Italian Olympic fencer
 Francesca Cipriani (born 1984), Italian television host and celebrity
 Frank A. Cipriani, university president
 Georges Cipriani (born 1950), former member of Action directe
 Giacomo Cipriani (born 1980), Italian football player
 Giovanni Battista Cipriani (1727–1785), also called Giuseppe Cipriani, Italian painter and engraver
 Giuseppe Cipriani (chef) (1900–1980), founded Harry's Bar in Venice in 1931
 Giuseppe Cipriani (racing driver) (born 1966), Italian racing driver
 Haim Fabrizio Cipriani (born 1971), Italian rabbi and professional musician
 Jean-Baptiste Cipriani (c. 1773–1818), Corsican maître d'hôtel and friend of Napoleon Bonaparte
 Jerry Cipriani, Canadian football (soccer) player
 Juan Luis Cipriani Thorne (born 1943), the Roman Catholic Archbishop of Lima
 Lidio Cipriani (1892–1962), Italian anthropologist and explorer
 Luciano Cipriani (born 1981), Argentine footballer
 Luigi Cipriani (born 1980), Italian footballer
 Mario Cipriani (1909–1944), Italian racing cyclist
 Mikey Cipriani (1886–1934), Trinidadian cricketer
 Nazzareno Cipriani (1843–1925), Italian painter 
 Renato Cipriani (born 1917), Italian footballer
 Sebastiano Cipriani (1662–1738), Italian architect of the late Baroque period
 Simone Cipriani (born 1964), Italian officer of the United Nations
 Stelvio Cipriani (1937–2018), Italian composer

Given name
 Cipriani Phillip (1936–2007), Trinidadian sprinter
 Cipriani Potter (1792–1871), British composer, pianist and educator

Other
 Cipriani S.A., a company with restaurants in Venice and New York City
 Cipriani College of Labour and Cooperative Studies (CCLCS), a public University located in Trinidad, named after Arthur Andrew Cipriani
 Casa Cipriani, a hotel and private membership club in New York City
 Hotel Cipriani, Venetian hotel built by Giuseppe Cipriani
 Toni Cipriani, a fictional character in the Grand Theft Auto video game series